Joseph N. Callahan was a record winning endurance swimmer from Pittsburgh, Pennsylvania. In 1907 he set the record for swimming the 12 miles of Manila Bay in 4.5 hours.

References

Male long-distance swimmers
Sportspeople from Pittsburgh
Year of death missing
Year of birth missing